The Taiwanese Ambassador to Palau is the official representative of the Republic of China to the Republic of Palau.

List of representatives

References 

Palau
China